The dinar (sign: £) was the currency of South Arabia and then South Yemen between 1965 and 1990. It was subdivided into 1000 fils (فلس). After Yemen's monetary unification on 1 July 1990, it was one of the two official currencies used in Yemen Republic until 11 June 1996.

History

The dinar was introduced in 1965 as the South Arabian dinar, replacing the East African shilling at a rate of 1 dinar = 20 shillings, thus setting the dinar initially equal to one pound sterling, it also used the pound sign as its Latin script symbol. It was renamed the South Yemeni dinar after the Federation of South Arabia and the Protectorate of South Arabia united in 1967 as independent South Yemen. The South Yemeni dinar was replaced with the Yemeni rial following unification with North Yemen in 1990. The exchange rate was £1 = Rls.26. Dinar banknotes remained legal tender until 1996.

For a wider history surrounding currency in the region, see British currency in the Middle East.

Coins

In 1965, coins (dated 1964) were introduced for both the Federation of South Arabia and the Protectorate of South Arabia in denominations of 1, 5, 25 and 50 fils. The 1 fils was struck in aluminium, the 5 fils in bronze and the higher two denominations in cupro-nickel.

In 1971, coins were issued in the name of "Democratic Yemen", changing to the "People's Democratic Republic of Yemen" in 1973. That year, aluminium  fils were introduced, followed by aluminium 10 fils and cupro-nickel 100 and 250 fils in 1981. The 10 fils was scalloped shaped whilst the 100 fils was octagonal.

Banknotes

On 1 April 1965, the South Arabian Currency Authority introduced notes in denominations of 250 and 500 fils, as well as £1 and £5. A £10 note was issued on 1 July 1967.

In 1984, the Bank of Yemen introduced 500 fils as well as £1, £5 and £10 notes that are like the preceding issues of South Arabia, except the English text and printer's imprint have been removed from the front, the name of the issuer has changed and now appears on the back, along with the name of the capital (ADEN).

References

Value

External links

Currencies of Yemen
South Yemen
Modern obsolete currencies
1965 establishments in the Federation of South Arabia
1990 disestablishments in Yemen